Songo Songo Island is the main island of the archipelago of the Songosongo Islands located in Songosongo ward of Kilwa District of Lindi Region in Tanzania. It is served by the Songo Songo Airstrip. The island's native inhabitants are the Matumbi people.

Airstrip 
Songo Songo Airstrip is a private aerodrome on the island. , it was served, along with nearby Mafia Island, by Coastal Aviation.

Gallery

References

Coastal islands of Tanzania
Geography of Lindi Region